The LG Optimus Pad LTE is a tablet computer developed by LG Electronics as a direct successor to the original LG Optimus Pad released in South Korea in January 2012. The LG Optimus Pad LTE was planned to be released worldwide but was cancelled due to its lackluster sales in its domestic market and mixed-to-negative reception towards the device leaving LG to withdraw in the tablet making for a brief period in the world market before the release of its successor the LG G Pad 8.3.

Features
The LG Optimus Pad LTE has a 2MP front-facing camera and a 8MP rear-facing camera. Like its predecessor, it features an 8.9-inch touchscreen that includes Wi-Fi 802.11b/g/n and Bluetooth 2.1 and is powered by a 6800 mAh Li-Ion which runs on a 1.5 GHz Qualcomm dual-core chipset and Android 3.2 Honeycomb with Optimus UI . And may upgradable to Android 4.1.2 Jelly Bean with CyanogenMod and Optimus UI

See also
LG Optimus Pad The predecessor to the LG Optimus Pad LTE
LG G Pad 8.3 The successor to the LG Optimus Pad LTE

References

Optimus Pad LTE
Tablet computers
Android (operating system) devices
Tablet computers introduced in 2012